The 1988–89 Austrian Hockey League season was the 59th season of the Austrian Hockey League, the top level of ice hockey in Austria. Six teams participated in the league, and GEV Innsbruck won the championship.

First round

Second round

Playoffs

External links
Austrian Ice Hockey Association

1988–89
Aus
League